Potassium fluoride is the chemical compound with the formula KF.  After hydrogen fluoride, KF is the primary source of the fluoride ion for applications in manufacturing and in chemistry.  It is an alkali halide and occurs naturally as the rare mineral carobbiite.  Solutions of KF will etch glass due to the formation of soluble fluorosilicates, although HF is more effective.

Preparation
Potassium fluoride is prepared by dissolving potassium carbonate in hydrofluoric acid. Evaporation of the solution forms crystals of potassium bifluoride. The bifluoride on heating yields potassium fluoride:
 K2CO3 + 4HF -> 2KHF2 + CO2 ^ + H2O
 KHF2 -> KF + HF ^
Platinum or heat resistant plastic containers are often used for these operations.

Potassium chloride converts to KF upon treatment with hydrogen fluoride.  In this way, potassium fluoride is recyclable.

Crystalline properties
KF crystallizes in the cubic NaCl crystal structure. The lattice parameter at room temperature is 0.266 nm.

Applications in organic chemistry
In organic chemistry, KF can be used for the conversion of chlorocarbons into fluorocarbons, via the Finkelstein (alkyl halides)  and Halex reactions (aryl chlorides).  Such reactions usually employ polar solvents such as dimethyl formamide, ethylene glycol, and dimethyl sulfoxide. More efficient fluorination of aliphatic halides can be achieved with a combination of crown ether and bulky diols in acetonitrile solvent.

Safety considerations
Like other sources of the fluoride ion, F−, KF is poisonous, although lethal doses approach gram levels for humans. It is harmful by inhalation and ingestion. It is highly corrosive, and skin contact may cause severe burns.

References

Potassium compounds
Alkali metal fluorides
Rock salt crystal structure